The 1988 Reading Borough Council election was held on 5 May 1988, at the same time as other local elections across England and Scotland. One third of Reading Borough Council's 45 seats were up for election.

The election saw Labour increase its majority on the council by one seat.

It was the first election following the merger of the SDP-Liberal Alliance to become the "Social and Liberal Democrats" as they were called at this election, before changing the name to Liberal Democrats the following year. Some SDP members opposed to the merger formed a new Social Democratic Party, which fielded several candidates in Reading in 1988.

Results

Ward results
The results in each ward were as follows (candidates with an asterisk* were the previous incumbent standing for re-election):

By-elections 19881990

Katesgrove by-election 1988

The Katesgrove ward by-election in 1988 was triggered by the resignation of Labour councillor Mark Hendry.

Battle by-election 1988

The Battle ward by-election in 1988 was triggered by the death of Labour councillor Kevin MacDevitt.

Abbey by-election 1989

The Abbey ward by-election in 1989 was triggered by the death of Labour councillor John Silverthorne. Newspaper coverage indicates that Jane Griffiths, the winning candidate, took about 60% of the votes, but does not give the exact number of votes she received.

References

1988 English local elections
1988